Jessika Ponchet and Isabella Shinikova were the defending champions but Shinikova chose to compete at the 2021 BGL Luxembourg Open instead. Ponchet partnered alongside Eden Silva, but lost in the semifinals to Momoko Kobori and Hiroko Kuwata.

Kobori and Kuwata went on to win the title, defeating Alicia Barnett and Olivia Nicholls in the final, 7–6(7–5), 7–6(7–2).

Seeds

Draw

Draw

References
Main Draw

Portugal Ladies Open - Doubles